Gemmula rosario is a species of sea snail, a marine gastropod mollusk in the family Turridae, the turrids.

Description
The length of the shell varies between 18 mm and 42 mm.

Disqtribution
This marine species occurs from Southeast Africa to Japan.

References

 Shikama T. (1977). Descriptions of new and noteworthy Gastropoda from western Pacific and Indian Oceans. Science Reports of the Yokohama National University, section II (Geology). 24: 1-23, 5 pls. page(s): 18
 Drivas, J. & Jay, M. (1987). Coquillages de La Réunion et de l'Île Maurice. Collection Les Beautés de la Nature. Delachaux et Niestlé: Neuchâtel. . 159 pp.
 Steyn, D.G. & Lussi, M. (1998) Marine Shells of South Africa. An Illustrated Collector's Guide to Beached Shells. Ekogilde Publishers, Hartebeespoort, South Africa, ii + 264 pp.

External links
  Tucker, J.K. 2004 Catalog of recent and fossil turrids (Mollusca: Gastropoda). Zootaxa 682:1-1295.
 gastropods.com: Gemmula (Gemmula) rosario

rosario
Gastropods described in 1977